Unique is the second album by the Danish eurodance producer DJ Encore, with vocals by Swedish singer Johanna Elkesdotter, whereas the first album featured the vocals of Danish singer Engelina. It was released on 8 May 2007 on US label Koch Records.

The song "You Can Walk on Water" is a cover version of the 2002 song "Walk on Water (Baby U Can)" by Danish dance act Catch. "Out There" was originally released on DJ Encore's first album, Intuition, with vocals by Engelina.

Track listing

References

External links
 Unique at Discogs

2007 albums
DJ Encore albums
Trance albums